KHSU (90.5 FM) is an NPR-member radio station, licensed to Arcata, California, United States. The station is currently owned by California State Polytechnic University, Humboldt. KHSU also holds licenses for additional stations running Radio Bilingüe and BBC World Service.

KHSU provides the region encompassing Humboldt and Del Norte counties in California as well as portions of Trinity and Mendocino counties in California and Curry County, Oregon, with news information and entertainment from public radio producers like National Public Radio (NPR), Public Radio International (PRI) and American Public Media (APM).

History

Early years
The station began as a radio classroom experiment in 1941 on the campus of what was then Humboldt State College, with broadcasts airing on KIEM for two months until the attack on Pearl Harbor. The radio program resumed in full in 1947, when KHSC-AM signed on as a 10-watt carrier current station.

In January 1960, Humboldt State applied for the first non-commercial radio license on a California college or university campus. The new station signed on for the first time on October 17, operating at 10 watts on 90.5 FM.  It became KHSU in 1972, shortly after Humboldt State was elevated to university status.

NPR membership
The station remained almost exclusively a student training ground until 1982, when it boosted its power to 100 watts and moved to 91.5 FM. At that point, the station began a gradual process of professionalization, picking up an NPR membership in 1984.  It returned to 90.5 in October 1984, this time with an increased signal of 9,000 watts.

In 1988, facing the prospect of waiting five years to qualify for grants from the Corporation for Public Broadcasting, KHSU shuffled its budget in order to enable it to hire the five full-time employees it needed for CPB funding within only five months of applying.

2019 staff cutbacks
On April 11, 2019, KHSU took a dramatic change in focus, personnel, and programming.  All staff and volunteers were called to a 9 a.m. meeting, at which the memo below was given to those present, essentially firing of all but two staffers, though both later resigned. HSU administrators then enlisted HSU police officers to escort all those involved off campus.  Door locks were changed, the station office was closed and phones disconnected, and KHSU began re-broadcasting programming from North State Public Radio in Chico, California. Volunteers, listeners, legislators and faculty members disagreed with HSU administrators' cutbacks, taken just a few days after a successful Fund Drive with no mention of the pending staff cuts. Subsequently, in 2021 HSU signed an agreement with Capital Public Radio, as NSPR was rendered a shell after CapRadio's operational takeover in 2020. NSPR currently operates KHSU stations from its offices in Chico.

KHSU simulcasts and translators
KHSU's programming can also be heard on KHSR 91.9 FM in Crescent City, KHSF 90.1 FM in Ferndale, and KHSG 89.9 FM in Garberville

KHSU (operating under the moniker "Diverse Public Radio") also makes the programming of Radio Bilingüe available to North Coast (and South Coast of Oregon) listeners through stations KHSM (103.3 McKinleyville and Wild Rivers Coast) and KIPE (89.7 Pine Hills - serving the Eel River Valley).

KHSU also operates two stations broadcasting BBC World Service 24 hours a day. KHSU-BBC is now broadcasting at 90.1 (KHSF, Ferndale) and at 107.7 (KHSQ, Trinidad). These stations are not managed by CapRadio.

See also
List of community radio stations in the United States

References

External links

HSU
Radio stations established in 1960
California State Polytechnic University, Humboldt
Mass media in Humboldt County, California
NPR member stations
Community radio stations in the United States